Bernardus Johannes Berkhout (born 18 April 1961, Santpoort, the Netherlands) is a family doctor, best known as a jazz clarinetist.

Medicine 
Berkhout studied medicine at the University of Leiden, the Netherlands, where he graduated in 1992. From 1992 until 2005, he worked as a doctor of orthopaedic medicine in Amsterdam (Kliniek Jan van Goyen Kade, Medisch Centrum Noord). From 1997 until 2000, he specialized to become a general practitioner. Since 2002, he has been working as a GP in Dordrecht, the Netherlands.

Musical career 
Bernhard Berkhout started playing the clarinet in 1970. Berkhout was discovered in the 1980s by the pianist Pim Jacobs, who presented him on Dutch television as a soloist with The Metropole Orkest under Rogier van Otterloo, together with the clarinetist Eddie Daniels. Subsequently, Berkhout founded a  successful quintet with the vibraphonist Frits Landesbergen called The Swingmates. In the early 1990s, Berkhout was chosen by the Schilperoort family as future leader of the Dutch Swing College Band, which was prevented by others after the death of Peter Schilperoort in 1990. As a result, this wish of Schilperoort's widow was never granted.

Despite the fact that Berkhout had won numerous awards such as the Edison Grammy Award, soloist award at the Jazzfetival Breda and the Peter Schilperoort Bandleaders Award, his musical activities dwindled in the 1990s, as he became more involved in medicine.

“Remarkable is Berkhout’s enormous drive. He becomes genuinely enthusiastic when other musicians play good solo’s and he lets himself be inspired to play clarinet solo’s of a calibre that has not been heard since the days of Jan Morks. He is Holland’s best jazz clarinettist by far.” (Bert Brandsma, saxophonist in the Chris Barber Jazz Band, Doctor Jazz magazine 2012)

Recent musical work 
In 2004, Berkhout felt the ‘Zeitgeist’. He read a book by Lewis Erenberg called Swingin’ the Dream about the role of popular music in the Great Depression. He discovered that in the Swing era, like in the ‘Sixties’, a new culture had bonded with popular music. Moreover, he concluded "that jazz was never so popular and popular music was never so sophisticated" as in the 1930s. In 2006, Berkhout decided to start a long-term project next to his work as a doctor. He choose the format of clarinet-soloist with a big band exploited by Benny Goodman and Artie Shaw in their days. In 2008 the "Doctor Bernard And His Swing Orchestra" was born.

In the meantime, dancing has grown in popularity. The 1930s dance the Lindy Hop fits his music. In 2010, this sparked the idea to record a CD for the dancing audience, called Let’s Dance. In 2011, the band visited Great Britain and Denmark and in July of the same year the band was the top attraction at The Amsterdam Lindy Exchange, where dancers from all over the world gathered to dance to swing music.
The Band toured in 2012 around and visit Switzerland and France.
There is now also a smaller Music Project which calls "Bernard Berkhout and friends" which meets once a month in a Club and play together Jazz.

Future 
Berkhout is preparing a musical show in which music from the swing-era is brought to the present day. Spoken word and music will combine to show the relevance of the American music from the Great Depression in today's world.
They worked on the second CD of the "Doctor Bernard And His Swing Orchestra" project.

Band members
Doctor Bernard And His Swing Orchestra consists of Berkhout (clarinet); Mirjam van Dam (voice); Erik van der Weijden, Hans Goemans, Kurt Schwab and Bert Brandsma (saxophone); Nanouk Brassers, Michael Varekamp, Koos van der Hout (trumpet); Jack Coenen, Marcus Glas (trombone); Mark van der Feen (piano); Hans Voogt(guitar); Frans Bouwmeester (bass); Barry Olthof (percussion).

Selected discography 
 1986 - Ode aan Benny Goodman, with the Pim Jacobs Trio 
 1987 - Fascinating Rhythm, The Swingmates (Edison Award) 
 1987 - Airmail Special, The Swingmates 
 1988 - Fascinating Rhythm
 1990 - Pennies from Heaven, The Swingmates 
 1991 - You’d be so nice to come home to, Bernard Berkhout clarinet, Jeroen Koning guitar
 1992 - Have you met miss Bell, The Swingmates with Madeline Bell 
 1993 - Have You Met Miss Bell?
 1994 - Royal Flush, with Ian Cooper and Ian Date (Australia) 
 1994 - Das Sonnenzeichen Krebs
 1995 - Jazz at the Philharmonic
 2006 - 4beat6, “The music of Benny Goodman” 
 2006 - Roots, with the Rosenberg Trio 
 2010 - Let’s Dance, Doctor Bernard And His Swing Orchestra

References

External links 
 Doctor Bernard and His Swing Orchestra website
 Discography at Discogs
 Online Review

1961 births
Living people
Dutch clarinetists
People from Velsen
Leiden University alumni
21st-century clarinetists